General elections were held in the Faroe Islands on 30 January 1940. The Union Party emerged as the largest party in the Løgting, winning 8 of the 24 seats.

Results

References

Elections in the Faroe Islands
Faroe Islands
1940 in the Faroe Islands
January 1940 events
Election and referendum articles with incomplete results